The Villa Pignatelli is a museum in Naples in southern Italy. The villa is located along the Riviera di Chiaia, the road bounding the north side of the Villa Comunale on the sea front between Mergellina and Piazza Vittoria.

History and Decoration
The villa was commissioned by admiral Ferdinand Acton in 1826 as a neo-classical residence that would be the centerpiece of a park. The design was completed by the architect Pietro Valente.

The architect Guglielmo Bechi designed the interior decorations of the apartments and the marble entrance staircase. He recruited sculptors to complete the neoclassical depiction of Alcibides and the Hounds.

The property has changed hands since construction: upon the death of Acton in 1841, it was bought by Carl Mayer von Rothschild of the German family of financiers. His monogram of CR can be seen in the first floor. For a time it was used by the Jewish community of Naples for services. In 1867, it was sold to the Duke of Monteleón, Diego Pignatelli Aragona y Cortes, whose widow the Princess Rosa Fici of the Dukes of Amafi then willed it to the Italian state in 1952, with instructions that the house and its possessions not be altered. The villa maintains the gardens in front of the building, and houses a coach museum and a collection of French and English vehicles from the 18th and 19th centuries.

In 1975, the Principe Diego Aragona Pignatelli Cortés Museum and the Carriage Museum located in the northern part of the garden were inaugurated.

References

External links
 Museo Pignatelli official website

Pignatelli
Neoclassical architecture in Naples
Houses completed in 1826
Rothschild family residences
Museums in Naples
Art museums and galleries in Naples
Carriage museums in Italy
1826 establishments in the Kingdom of the Two Sicilies
1826 establishments in Italy
National museums of Italy